Grace Avery VanderWaal (born January 15, 2004) is an American singer, songwriter and actress. She is known for her distinctive vocals and has often accompanied herself on the ukulele.

VanderWaal began her musical career by posting videos of her original songs and covers on YouTube and performing at open mic nights near her home in Suffern, New York. In September 2016, at age 12, she won the eleventh season of the NBC   competition show America's Got Talent (AGT), performing her original songs. In December 2016, with Columbia Records and Syco Music, she released her debut EP Perfectly Imperfect, which became the best selling EP that year. Her first full-length studio album, Just the Beginning (2017), debuted at number 22 on the U.S Billboard 200. She released a second EP, Letters Vol. 1, in 2019.

She has performed at the Planet Hollywood Resort & Casino in Las Vegas, Madison Square Garden, the opening and closing of the 2017 Special Olympics World Winter Games in Austria, various benefit concerts, the Austin City Limits Music Festival and on various television talk shows. VanderWaal conducted her first concert tour in 2017 in support of Just the Beginning. She next toured in mid-2018 with Imagine Dragons in their Evolve World Tour, and in 2019, after opening in a tour for Florence and the Machine, she headlined her own Ur So Beautiful tour. She made her acting debut in 2020, starring as Susan "Stargirl" Caraway in the Disney+ musical drama film Stargirl, followed by its 2022 sequel Hollywood Stargirl.

VanderWaal has received 2 Radio Disney Music Awards (including a Best New Artist award), a Teen Choice Award, the 2017 Billboard Women In Music Rising Star Award, and the 2018 MTV Europe Music Award for Best Push Act. She has been named to Billboard magazine's 21 Under 21 list of fast-rising young music stars five times (2016–2019 and 2021) and is the youngest person ever included in the Forbes 30 Under 30 music list.

Early life

Family and education
VanderWaal was born near Kansas City, Kansas, to Tina and David VanderWaal, who lived in Lenexa at the time. Her father is of Dutch descent. When he became a vice president of marketing at LG Electronics in 2007, the family moved to Suffern, New York. VanderWaal later moved to South Carolina. She has an older brother and sister. After winning America's Got Talent in 2016, VanderWaal was home-schooled and enrolled in online courses for 7th grade but later attended public school part of the time. She graduated from the Laurel Springs School in 2022.

Early musical efforts
VanderWaal began singing and making up songs at the age of three. As a preteen, she found songwriting inspiration by watching movies and trying to imagine what a character was feeling, and "what it would be like if I were them, and wrote a song." She decided to learn the ukulele after watching a Brazilian au pair play and seeing a Twenty One Pilots video on YouTube. She asked for one for her 11th birthday but her mother refused, thinking she would never learn to play it. Then she bought one herself, using money she received for her 11th birthday, and watched more videos to teach herself how to play. She also played the saxophone in her school's marching band.

In 2015, VanderWaal began to record song covers and original songs, accompanying herself on ukulele, and to post them on her YouTube channel.

A review of VanderWaal's album Just the Beginning in USA Today stated: "VanderWaal's big-throated performance on 'A Better Life' channels Florence Welch and Miley Cyrus. There's a certain chirp in VanderWaal's voice that's reminiscent of Swift, but otherwise, her vocals align much more closely to Sia's in her full-voiced belting and nonchalant pronunciations. ... VanderWaal sounds like a 13-year-old in her songs, in the best possible way. In a voice that sounds refreshingly green, she launches herself at huge choruses with a total lack of restraint." A reviewer for The Buffalo News wrote that the "vast diversity in her songwriting ... makes her stand out as a truly unique and exquisite artist." Selina Fragassi of the Chicago Sun-Times commented that, on the album, VanderWaal's "raspy-sweet-peculiar vocals recall Elle King, Regina Spektor and Katy Perry ... [and] proves herself a modern-day Mozart". Critics writing in the Houston Chronicle similarly praised VanderWaal's "smart pop songs that beautifully showcase her persona and wonderfully peculiar rasp of a voice." A reviewer for the Dallas Observer opined that VanderWaal's lyrics tackle "complicated issues with aplomb as her raspy, warbling voice undulates around each syllable."

A reviewer called VanderWaal's Seattle concert in February 2018 "a well balanced set of ballads and full energy songs. ... [H]er stage and style are a boho chic age appropriate complement to her teenage themed, yet old-soul-mind works. ... Her set was full of sweet commentary and incredible vocals". Abby Jones of Billboard wrote that her performance of her single "Clearly" on The Late Show in 2018 was "moving ... stunningly bold ... mature, powerful". A reviewer for Mass Live said of her performance on tour in June 2018 that she "was a pleasant surprise ... holding her own in the arena rock milieu. [She] won over the crowd". Later that month, a tour reviewer noted, in Argus Leader, "her whimsical flower crown, carefree attitude and incredible voice. ... VanderWaal captivated the audience". Another wrote in Milwaukee Journal Sentinel that "VanderWaal is one of the youngest performers at Summerfest [2018]. She's also one of the most talented, bringing a honeyed, slightly frayed rasp to assured pop songs".

A reviewer in Vanity Fair called VanderWaal's 2019 single, "Stray", "contemplative, haunting ... ["Stray" and "Hideaway" are] mature and grounded – a progression from her previous work". A Rolling Stone critic found her 2019 single "Waste My Time" "a major departure for the teen. ... The more mature track is dream-pop bliss". MTV's critic called the 2019 music video for her song "I Don't Like You" "a sharp portrait [that] ... represents the chaos, confusion, and anger we often feel in relationships. ... In a style reminiscent of Sia's best videos ... with such deep-cutting lyrics ... and sharp visuals". V magazine called her 2022 song "Lion's Den" "relatable and poignant ... a resounding cry for her generation. ... It's a powerful, unfiltered story of someone coming into their own, told with unflinching honesty and candidness."

Billboard magazine named VanderWaal to its 21 Under 21 list of "music's hottest young stars" in four consecutive years, 2016–2019. Variety listed her in its "Young Hollywood Impact Report 2017". She was a finalist in the Best Female Artist category at the International Acoustic Music Awards in 2017, the youngest finalist in the awards' history. VanderWaal won the 2017 Radio Disney Music Award for Best New Artist and a 2017 Teen Choice Award. Refinery29 included her on its 2017 list of 29 young actors, singers and activists "on the verge of superstardom." VanderWaal is credited with helping to boost the popularity of the ukulele, and in 2017, Fender named her as its youngest Signature Series artist ever and its first collaboration with a ukulele player; the instrument line was released in 2018. VanderWaal received Billboards 2017 Women in Music Rising Star Award and the 2018 MTV Europe Music Award for Best Push Artist. She is the youngest person ever included in the Forbes 30 Under 30 music list. In 2019 the New York State Senate awarded her its Women of Distinction honor for her efforts to expand musical education in the East Ramapo Central School District.

By 2018, VanderWaal had accumulated eight million followers on social media. As of 2022, her Instagram account has more than five million followers, her YouTube channel has more than three million subscribers, and her Facebook page more than one million followers. Billboard again named her to its 21 Under 21 list in 2021.

Awards and nominations

Filmography

Film

Discography

Albums

EPs

Charted singles

Tours

Headlining
 Just the Beginning Tour (2017–2018)
 Ur So Beautiful Tour (2019)

Opening act
 Imagine Dragons – Evolve World Tour (2018)
 Florence and the Machine – High as Hope Tour (2019)

Notes

References

External links

2018 documentary about VanderWaal by UPROXX
VanderWaal's "Tiny Desk Concert" at NPR (2018)
2022 documentary about VanderWaal

2004 births
21st-century American singers
America's Got Talent winners
American child singers
American people of Dutch descent
American ukulele players
Child pop musicians
Columbia Records artists
Living people
People from Lenexa, Kansas
People from Suffern, New York
Singer-songwriters from New York (state)
21st-century American women singers
Singer-songwriters from Kansas